Jhva Elohim Meth is the debut EP by Swedish band Katatonia, self-released in 1992.

Holland label VIC Records re-released the EP on CD with the title Jhva Elohim Meth... The Revival, and in 2000 in LP format. The band admit in their 20th anniversary documentary included on Last Fair Day Gone Night that the intended title uses the word Jehova but they could not remember how to spell it correctly.

The track "Without God" was re-recorded for the band's 1993 debut album Dance of December Souls.

Track listing
 "Midwinter Gates (prologue)"  – 0:43
 "Without God"  – 6:52
 "Palace of Frost"  – 3:40
 "The Northern Silence"  – 4:00
 "Crimson Tears (epilogue)"  – 1:56

Personnel 
Band
 Jonas Renkse – drums, vocals and lyrics
 Anders Nyström – electric & acoustic guitars, bass and music

Additional musicians
 Dan Swanö – all acoustic vocals, keyboards, mixing & engineering

References

1993 EPs
Katatonia EPs